Barsine mactans is a moth of the family Erebidae. It was described by Arthur Gardiner Butler in 1877. It is found in India and China.

References

Moths of Asia
Nudariina
Moths described in 1877